The Canterbury Multi-Use Arena, also known as Te Kaha, is a multi-use sports arena to be built in Christchurch, New Zealand, on land bordered by Hereford, Madras, Tuam, and Barbadoes Streets. The facility is designed as a replacement for Lancaster Park, which was damaged in the 2011 Christchurch Earthquake and subsequently demolished in 2019. The stadium is part of the Christchurch Central Recovery Plan developed by the government in 2012.

Progress 
After many years of discussion, the city council confirmed a stadium investment case in December 2019 and cabinet approved its funding contribution in March 2020. Completion of the construction project is hoped for 2024.

On 22 July 2021, a majority of Christchurch City Council councillors made a preliminary decision last month to reduce the capacity to 25,000, but councillors voted on 12 August 2021 to backtrack on that decision after it was revealed the 30,000-seat option would only cost an extra $50 million, rather than the $88 million councillors were originally advised of.

Timeline

2012
In July 2012, the Christchurch Central Development Unit released their 100-day blueprint also known as the Christchurch Central Recovery Plan it included a new permanent 35,000 seat multi-purpose sports and entertainment venue as an anchor project within a scheme for a future city vision. The  site is bounded by Tuam, Madras, Hereford and Barbadoes Streets. The Government took responsibility for acquiring the land needed for the stadium.

2017

The Multi-Use Arena Pre-Feasibility Study: Christchurch was requested by the then Minister supporting Greater Christchurch Regeneration Nicky Wagner and the Christchurch City Council to develop and present a pre-feasibility study for the development of a new multi-use arena. This study did not consider any options with 35,000 seats as option as it would be too expensive and the general consensus among stakeholders (except for International Rugby) was that the capacity was higher than Christchurch needed, and was prohibitively expensive.

2021
In March 2021, a consortium of businesses were confirmed as the successful tenderer for the design and construction of the Canterbury Multi-Use Arena. The group known as Kōtui is led by Australian-based stadium construction experts, BESIX Watpac, Kōtui includes Christchurch-based construction companies Southbase Construction and Fulton Hogan, local seismic engineering specialists Lewis Bradford, Christchurch architects Warren and Mahoney, and global stadium design experts Populous and Mott MacDonald.

2022
It was announced on 27 January that the name of the facility would be 'Te Kaha'. Te Kaha being a shortened version of Te Kaharoa (meaning ‘enduring strength’), which is the name that Ngāi Tūāhuriri gifted to the land bounded by Madras, Hereford, Barbadoes and Tuam streets.

On 14 July, the Christchurch City Council voted to sign a $683 million contract to build Te Kaha. This will require the council to invest an extra $150 million, which they plan to do by increasing rates. The council received 30,000 submissions about the stadium, with 77% being in favour. Barry Bragg, the Te Kaha project delivery board chairman, said it was a fixed price contract, meaning that there will be no further increases of the cost of the project.

References

Sports venues in Christchurch
Indoor arenas in New Zealand
Buildings and structures in Christchurch